Hickory Grove Township is one of eleven townships in Benton County, Indiana.  As of the 2020 census, its population was 398 and it contained 168 housing units. It was organized in March 1876 and named for a grove of hickory trees that grew within its borders in the 19th century.

Geography

Cities and towns
 Ambia

Unincorporated towns
 Dunn
 Handy
 Powley Corners
 Talbot

Adjacent townships
 Grant (east)
 Parish Grove (north)
 Prairie Township, Warren County (south)

Major highways
  Indiana State Road 71
  Indiana State Road 352

Cemeteries
The township contains one cemetery, Totheroh.

References

Citations

Sources
 
 United States Census Bureau cartographic boundary files

External links

 Indiana Township Association
 United Township Association of Indiana

Townships in Benton County, Indiana
Lafayette metropolitan area, Indiana
Townships in Indiana
1876 establishments in Indiana